Derbyshire Community Health Services NHS Trust was one of the community health trusts created in 2012.

It was authorised as a foundation trust in October 2014.

The trust has established a Responsive Workforce Model using HealthRoster Software and SafeCare, which they say has reduced agency spend, ensured quality and freed up nurses for hands-on care.

It was named by the Health Service Journal as the second-best community trust to work for in 2015.  At that time it had 3227 full-time equivalent staff and a sickness absence rate of 4.13%. 78% of staff recommend it as a place for treatment and 65% recommended it as a place to work.

The trust announced plans to merge with Derbyshire Healthcare NHS Foundation Trust in November 2016, but the planned merger did not occur and the two trusts continue in existence.

In 2022 work started on a new health hub, on Baslow Road, Bakewell which will provide facilities for community health services and an ambulance service base, replacing the 19th century Newholme Hospital. It will have 10 consultation rooms and four treatment rooms,s a children’s area, group room, office space, large waiting area, baby feeding and changing rooms, toilets and reception.

See also
 List of NHS trusts

References

External links
 Derbyshire Community Health Services NHS Trust

NHS foundation trusts
Health in Derbyshire
Community health NHS trusts